Mike Howe (August 21, 1965 – July 26, 2021) was an American heavy metal singer who performed with Metal Church, Heretic, and Snair.

Career
Howe began his career as the singer for a Detroit band called Hellion (later renamed Snair after moving to Los Angeles) before joining the band Heretic, who were formed in 1986. Heretic released its sole full-length album, Breaking Point in 1988 before Howe departed to join Metal Church and Heretic disbanded.

From 1988 until 1996 Howe sang in Metal Church, replacing David Wayne. After Howe joined Metal Church the subject matter deepened. The band's lyrics tackled political and social issues of the day with the releases of Blessing in Disguise and The Human Factor. Howe recorded three albums with Metal Church before the group split up in 1996.

Although he had rarely recorded or performed outside of Heretic and Metal Church, Howe provided guest vocals on Hall Aflame's 1991 album Guaranteed Forever and Megora's 1997 EP Illusions.

Metal Church founder Kurdt Vanderhoof reported in 1998 that Howe had retired and was living in Tennessee with his family. Outside music, he had a full-time job in carpentry and was a father to two sons born in 1997 and 2002, respectively.

On April 30, 2015, Metal Church announced that Howe had rejoined the band, and he appeared on two more albums with them – XI (2016) and Damned If You Do (2018), as well as their 2017 live album Classic Live and the 2020 compilation album From The Vault.

Death
On July 26, 2021, Metal Church announced via the band's Facebook page Howe died that morning at his home in Eureka, California, at the age of 55. The cause of death was ruled suicide. He was the second singer of Metal Church to have died, following David Wayne in May 2005.

Discography

With Heretic 
Breaking Point (1988, Metal Blade)

With Metal Church 
Blessing in Disguise (1989)
The Human Factor (1991)
Hanging in the Balance (1993)
XI (2016)
Classic Live (2017)
Damned If You Do (2018)
 From the Vault (2020)

References

External Links
 

American heavy metal singers
People from Taylor, Michigan
1965 births
2021 deaths
2021 suicides
Metal Church members

Suicides by hanging in California